The 2020 Big Sky Conference women's basketball tournament was a postseason tournament that was scheduled to be played from March 9–13, 2020, at CenturyLink Arena in Boise, Idaho. The winner of the tournament would have earned an automatic bid to the 2020 NCAA tournament. On March 12, the NCAA announced that the tournament was cancelled due to the coronavirus pandemic.

Schedule

Bracket

References

2019–20 Big Sky Conference women's basketball season
Big Sky Conference women's basketball tournament
Big Sky
Big Sky Conference women's basketball tournament
Basketball competitions in Boise, Idaho
College basketball tournaments in Idaho
Women's sports in Idaho